Puusepp is an Estonian surname meaning carpenter (literally "woodsmith") and may refer to the following individuals:
Edgar Puusepp (1911–1982), Estonian wrestler 
Endel Puusepp (1909–1996), Estonian Soviet era World War II pilot
Ludvig Puusepp (1875–1942), Estonian surgeon, researcher and the world's first professor of neurosurgery
Markus Puusepp (born 1986), Estonian orienteering competitor 
Raivo Puusepp (born 1960), Estonian architect

See also
 Puusepa, Võru County
 Puusepa, Harju County

Estonian-language surnames
Occupational surnames